Commotria phyrdes is a species of snout moth in the genus Commotria. It was described by Harrison Gray Dyar Jr. in 1914, and is known from Panama.

References

Moths described in 1914
Anerastiini